Åland dialects are dialects of Swedish spoken in Åland, an autonomous province of Finland. The Åland dialects have similarities to both Finland Swedish and the historical dialects of Uppland, but are generally considered to be part of Eastern Swedish (östsvenska mål, varieties of Swedish spoken in Finland and Estonia).

Phonology
As in Finland Swedish, the tonal word accent that distinguishes certain minimal pairs is not present in Åland.

Characteristics
Certain expressions are typical of Åland dialects. ( in Standard Swedish)) carries the implication that the asker might know the parents of the person asked, likely in a small society such as Åland.

Vocabulary
The dialectal vocabulary of Åland Swedish is composed of words that are either characteristic of Eastern Swedish or have passed out of use (but are still understood) in the Swedish spoken in Sweden. Traces of Finnish, Russian and English can also be found in the dialect because of historical contact.

Below is a selection of dialectal words and expressions used in Åland Swedish:

Differences between dialects in Western and Eastern Åland
The Western Åland dialect is characterized by its connection to the dialects of eastern Uppland (Roslagen). This applies especially to the municipality of Eckerö. On the other hand, the Eastern Åland dialects share features with Swedish dialects in Åboland and southern Ostrobothnia. 

Between the dialects of Western and Eastern Åland, there are also several distinctions in vocabulary. For example, in Western Åland, as well as in Uppland, the verb  and the adjective  are used.

Samples of dialects 

Eckerö-dialect (West Åland) recorded in 2006 (see file för transcription).

Föglö-dialect (East Åland) recorded in 1971 by Per Henrik Solstrand.

See also
 Languages of Åland

References

Bibliography
Andersson, Sven. Notlage, notlösare och notgår: ordens betydelse i åländska folkmål. Part of Skrifter utgivna av Historiska samfundet i Åbo. 1954. pp. 18–30.
Ramsdahl, Carl. Ryska lånord i åländskan. 1976.
Sundberg, Eva. Dialekten i Ålands nordöstra skärgård. Mariehamn 1993.
Svenblad, Ralf. Med åländska ord. Mariehamn 1996.
Willandt, August. Åländskt bygdemål. 1919.

External links
 Ryska lånord i åländskan (Russian loanwords in Åland Swedish)
 Listen to spoken Åland Swedish

Swedish language
Languages of Finland
Swedish
Finland Swedish